Bayan I reigned as the first khagan of the Avar Khaganate between 562 and 602.

As the Göktürk Empire expanded westwards on the Eurasian Steppe during the 6th century, peoples such as the  Avars (also known as the Pseudo-Avars, Obri, Abaroi and Varchonites) and the Bulgars migrated into Central Europe and the Balkans. Bayan I led the Avars (along with some Bulgars) into Pannonia, where they established their khaganate from 568.

Raids against the Franks and Lombards 
By 562, the Avars and Bulgars had reached the Lower Danube: it was most likely in that year that Bayan became their supreme Khagan, as his predecessor, the Kutrigur khan Zabergan had died.

As allies of the Byzantine Empire (ruled at time by Justinian I), the Avars had obtained a grant of gold to crush other nomads — the Sabirs, Utigurs, Kutrigurs and Saragurs - in the lands later known as Ukraine, a task they accomplished to the emperor's satisfaction. Bayan's Avars now exacted the renewal of the alliance, increased pay and a land to live in.

Bayan had eyed the plain of Moesia, just south of the Lower Danube, what would become northern Bulgaria, as his promised land, but the Byzantines were adamant the Avars should not in any case cross the river. So Bayan and his horde in 563 rode around the northern Carpathians to Germany, where they were soundly stemmed along the river Elbe  by the Frankish king Sigebert I of Austrasia. This defeat induced them to come back on their footsteps to the Lower Danube region. After vainly trying to force the Danubian border when the new Byzantine emperor Justin II denied them both entry and wage, the Avars renewed their ride to Thuringia. This time (566) they did defeat Sigebert, but had nonetheless to stop; in the meantime the Göktürks, in pursuit of their former subjects, remained a real danger.

The Avars, traditionally a nomadic people, desperately needed both shelter and pasture for their livestock, but the route to Pannonia was blocked by impassable mountains covered with thick forests: the Carpathian range. It was in the critical winter of 566-567 that the Avars, stuck in what is now eastern Germany, were sent feelers by Alboin, the strong ruler of the Lombards and brother-in-law of Sigebert, who sought an alliance to crush his old enemies the Gepids. These last ones, by chance, controlled the only practical way from the Lower Danube to the craved Pannonian pastures. So in 567 (see Lombard–Gepid War (567)) king Cunimund's Gepid kingdom was attacked by two directions: from the west came the Lombards, from the north, through Moravia and the Danube, the Avars. Bayan crushed Cunimund's forces and made a cup from his defeated enemy's skull as a present (and warning) for his ally Alboin (who is famously quoted as having forced Cunimond's daughter Rosamund, whom he had taken as war bride, to drink from it, sealing his own fate). Then the Avar horde marched against Sirmium, by now firmly held by Gepid remnants and a Byzantine garrison led by general Bonosus. In the meantime large numbers of Slavs settled in Pannonia in the wake of the Avars; and in 568 Alboin and his Lombards deemed it wise to move for the half-ruined but promising lands of Italy where they would establish a long-lasting kingdom. They concluded however a treaty with the Avar Khagan so as they could reenter parts of Pannonia and Noricum (Austria) if they chose so in the future, then departed with large numbers of the vanquished Gepids and a host of other Germanic tribes.

Wars with Byzantium 
After ten years of uneasy, undocumented peace, Bayan again marched against Sirmium, wresting it from Byzantine hands after a two-year siege, then took also Singidunum, evicting the Byzantines from the inner Balkans and opening the area to an unstoppable influx of Slavs, that in five years at most flooded all the semi-abandoned region down to the Peloponnesus. It was the year 582: Bayan was now able to attack the Byzantines in Thrace, and when Tiberius II Constantine, who had failed in stopping him, was succeeded in Constantinople by his son-in-law Maurice, he managed to extract a huge tribute in gold: 100,000 gold coins, or some 1,000 lbs, per year.

In later times Avars and Slavs still raided the remaining Byzantine lands as Maurice was hard pressed to defend his native Cappadocia and Armenia from the mighty Sassanians of Persia. By 592 the Byzantine ruler, once he defeated the Persian menace, was bent on revenge and counterattacked in full force, soon reverting the roles (see Maurice's Balkan campaigns). Repeated, massive defeats shook the Avaro-Slavic hordes as strong organized Byzantine armies penetrated north of the Danube into Wallachia, and eventually, under general Priscus, crushed the enemy along the river Tisza in the very heart of Pannonia. It was Phocas' rebellion against Maurice in 602 that ultimately saved the Avars. In the same year Khagan Bayan died, his empire now safe and firmly established.

References 

Lászlo Makkai and András Mócsy, editors, 2001. History of Transylvania, II.4 "The period of Avar rule"
 

6th-century births
602 deaths
6th-century monarchs in Europe
Pannonian Avars
Avar–Byzantine wars
6th century in Romania
6th century in Serbia